De Stradivarus  or Zijn viool is a 1914 Dutch silent drama film directed by Maurits Binger and Louis H. Chrispijn.

Cast
Boris Lensky	... 	Violist / Violin player
Margot Laurentius-Jonas	... 	Moeder / Mother
Mientje Kling	... 	Elsa
Eugenie Krix	... 	Gravin de Montjoie / Countess de Montjoie
Theo Frenkel		
Jan Holtrop	... 	Houtvester / Forester
Koba Kinsbergen		
Bertha Laurentius		
Christine van Meeteren		
Jan van Dommelen

References

External links 
 

Dutch silent short films
1914 films
Dutch black-and-white films
1914 drama films
Films directed by Louis H. Chrispijn
Films directed by Maurits Binger
Dutch drama films
Silent drama films